Sandeep Marwah is an Indian film producer, director, educator, journalist and businessman. He is the founder-president of the Asian Academy of Film & Television and Noida Film City, and is the chairman of the advisory committee of Miss Earth India. Marwah is also the founder-owner of Marwah Studios and has produced a number of short films.

Early life and career
Sandeep Marwah was born in Delhi, India. In 1986 Sandeep Marwah proposed a film city project to the Delhi Government but it was rejected. In 1987 Noida Authority accepted the project and in 1988 Noida Film City was founded. He was nominated as the Chief Scout of India in 2019.

In September 2019, Sandeep Marwah met Khaltmaagiin Battulga, President of Mongolia for better relationship between both the countries. In 2020, Marwah and Nejmeddine Lakhal, Tunisian ambassador to India, signed an MoU to develop and promote films, art and culture.

Personal life
Sandeep is married to Reena Kapoor, who is the daughter of Indian film producer Surinder Kapoor. With her he has two sons Mohit Marwah and Akshay Marwah. Elder son Mohit is married to Antara Motiwala 
while Younger son Akshay Marwah is married to Aashita Relan.

Bibliography

In popular culture
A biography on the life of Marwah, titled "A Walk In The Corridor of Eternity", was written by Shreeya Katyal.

Dr. Sandeep Marwah is the case study for more than 27 countries of the world. Training program organized by the Ministry of Skill Development and Entrepreneurship (MSDE).

References

External links 
 

Indian film producers
People from Delhi
Living people
Indian educators
1960 births